The Ansaris of Panipat are descended from Khwaja Abdullah Pir of Herat, one of whose descendants settled in Panipat, which was a centre of learning and was already famous for its Mashaikh and Auliya.

Modern Era

The Ansaris of Panipat intermarry with the Pirzadas and Makhdumzadas of Panipat and the Syeds of Barsat and Sonepat. The Urdu poet and writer, Altaf Hussain Hali, was born in Panipat as a descendant of the Ansaris. Pakistani nationalist scholars consider his Musaddas-e Hali as an important text leading to the development of Pakistani nationalism. He also wrote the Yadgar-e Ghalib, Hayat-e Saadi, and Hayat-e Javed, which were biographies of Ghalib, Saadi, and Syed Ahmed Khan respectively.

Mughal Empire
The Ansaris of Panipat held high offices during Muslim rule for several generations.

Lutfullah Khan Sadiq 
Shams ud-Daulah Lutfullah Khan Panipati was the wakil of Prince Jahan Shah in Bahadur Shah's time, and deserted him during the War of Succession, gaining the favour of Jahandar Shah. Lutfullah Khan enjoyed the confidence of Farrukhsiyar through flattery, but worked hand in glove with the Sayyid brothers. The Syed brothers considered him to be a source of mischief and deprived him of his rank, and his gardens and mansions were confiscated. As the Mir-i-Saman of Muhammad Shah and later Diwan-i-Khalisa, Lutfullah Khan enjoyed the confidence of the Emperor and enjoyed great influence at court. He succeeded his brother Sher Afgan Khan as governor of Multan. He was later the governor of Shahjahanabad.

Sher Afgan Khan Panipati 
Sher Afgan Khan of Panipat was the governor of Multan in the reign of Muhammad Shah. His son was married to the daughter of the Mughal Grand vizier Turrah Baz Khan, another native of Panipat. At court the Mughal Vizier relied on him to support his own faction at court, which was opposed to Khan-i Dauran, an Indian Muslim from Agra who was the Commander-in-Chief of the Mughal empire.

Zakariya Khan 
Zakariya Khan Bahadur was a descendant of the Ansaris. Originally governor of Jammu, he took part in the expeditions against the Sikhs. Zakariya Khan was the governor of Lahore at the time of Nader Shah's invasion.

Diler Dil Khan 
Moin ud-Daulah Diler Dil Khan, originally Khwaja Abdullah, was the son of Khwaja Abdur Razzaq of Panipat. He is mentioned in the Siyar-ul-Mutahkerin as "Dilere Khan, of Puniput, brother of Zakariah Khan Sadik". He had the mansab of 6000, and was the governor of Thatta and Kabul during the reign of Muhammad Shah. From 1735-1738 , he was governor of Kashmir.

Yahya Khan
Yahya Khan, the son of Zakariya Khan, succeeded his father as governor of Lahore.

References

Ansari family
Panipat